This is a list of television programs that have been broadcast by American television network Cooking Channel.

References

 
Cooking Channel